The Guggenheim Museum SoHo was a branch of the Guggenheim Museum designed by Arata Isozaki that was located at the corner of Broadway and Prince Street in SoHo, Manhattan, New York City. The museum opened in 1992 and closed in 2001 after hosting exhibits that included Marc Chagall and the Jewish Theater, Paul Klee at the Guggenheim Museum, Robert Rauschenberg: A Retrospective, and Andy Warhol: The Last Supper, which served as a key part of the museum's permanent collection. The closing was initially hoped to be temporary, but the museum closed permanently in 2002.

Initial attendance was forecast to be 250,000 visitors a year, but the museum drew between 125,000 and 200,000 its first year, and attendance did not increase in subsequent years. The museum restructured in 1999 to shrink its exhibition space from 27,000 to 20,000 square feet to reduce its operating costs.

See also
 List of Guggenheim Museums

References

External links

Broadway (Manhattan)
Defunct museums in New York City
Museums disestablished in 2001
Museums established in 1992
Museums in Manhattan
SoHo, Manhattan
Solomon R. Guggenheim Foundation